The Bear Island State Forest is a state forest in Minnesota bordered by the towns of Ely, Babbitt, and Tower in Lake and Saint Louis counties. It is adjacent to the Burntside State Forest and the federally managed Superior National Forest and Boundary Waters Canoe Area Wilderness. It is managed primarily by the Minnesota Department of Natural Resources and the counties.

Prior to European settlement, the area was dominated by the old-growth Eastern White Pine which was completely harvested around the beginning of the twentieth century. Subsequent wildfires in the area have caused the dominance of primary successional species such as birch, aspen, and Jack pine.

There is boat access to the  Bear Island Lake,  Birch Lake, as well as canoe and boat access to multiple smaller lakes within the forest. The Taconite State Trail runs through the forest, although it can only be accessed through the nearby Bear Head Lake State Park and Soudan Underground Mine State Park.

See also
 List of Minnesota state forests

References

External links
 Bear Island State Forest - Minnesota Department of Natural Resources (DNR)

Minnesota state forests
Protected areas established in 1963
Protected areas of Lake County, Minnesota
Protected areas of St. Louis County, Minnesota